Qarunavus is an extinct genus of mammals in the order Ptolemaiida. A single species, Qarunavus meyeri is known from the Lower Oligocene  Jebel Qatrani Formation of modern-day Egypt. Described by Elwyn Simons & Philip Gingerich in 1974, the genus name is a combination of Qarun, the Arabic term for Lake Moeris, and -avus, Latin for "ancestor". The specific epithet honors Grant E. Mayer of the Yale Peabody Museum.

References

Oligocene mammals of Africa
Fossil taxa described in 1974
Ptolemaiidans
Prehistoric placental genera